Krupski Młyn  (German Kruppamühle) is a village in Tarnowskie Góry County, Silesian Voivodeship, in southern Poland. It is the seat of the 
gmina (administrative district) called Gmina Krupski Młyn.

The village has a population of 2,000.

External links 
 Jewish Community in Krupski Młyn on Virtual Shtetl

References

Villages in Tarnowskie Góry County